Dave Johnson is an American football coach and former player. He served as the head football coach at Simon Fraser University in British Columbia from 2007 to 2013.

Johnson was drafted by the BC Lions of the Canadian Football League in the 6th round of the 1988 CFL Draft.

References

Year of birth missing (living people)
Living people
American football linebackers
Simon Fraser Clan football players
Simon Fraser Clan football coaches